Thiratoscirtus oberleuthneri is a species of jumping spider in the genus Thiratoscirtus that lives in Gabon. The male was first described in 2015.

References

Endemic fauna of Gabon
Salticidae
Spiders of Africa
Spiders described in 2015
Fauna of Gabon